Seed Mob is an Indigenous youth climate network in Australia.

History 
Seed is Australia's first Indigenous climate network and was formed in 2014. It is led by Aboriginal and Torres Strait Islander young people. It was initially a branch of the Australian Youth Climate Coalition but became independent in 2020. 

It was cofounded by Amelia Telford. Telford is currently its National Director.

In 2015, Seed, in an alliance of 13 environmental groups, was successful in campaigning for Australia’s four largest banks to rule out funding the Adani coal mine in Queensland.

It is currently campaigning Origin Energy to stop gas fracking in the Beetaloo Basin in the Northern Territory. It produced a film about the campaign called Water is Life in 2019.

References 

Climate change organisations based in Australia
Youth-led organizations